Elk Knob is a mountain in the North Carolina High Country, north of the community of Meat Camp. Its elevation reaches .

The mountain is the headwaters of the North Fork New River and feeder creeks to the South Fork New River (via Meat Camp Creek).  The mountain is home to Elk Knob State Park. Elk Knob is partially formed by amphibolites of the Ashe Metamorphic Suite and Alligator Back Metamorphic suite.

References

Mountains of North Carolina
Mountains of Watauga County, North Carolina